Arthur Delaney is a track runner formerly with the Oregon Ducks He ran in the Olympic Trials in 2016. who competed at multiple NCAA championships.  He was a gold medalist at the 2012 World Junior Championships in Athletics – Men's 4 × 100 metres relay

References

Living people
Place of birth missing (living people)
Year of birth missing (living people)
Oregon Ducks men's track and field athletes